Newton Abbot is a constituency in Devon represented in the House of Commons of the UK Parliament since its 2010 creation by Anne Marie Morris, a Conservative.

History
Parliament accepted the Boundary Commission's Fifth Periodic Review of Westminster constituencies proposing to create this constituency for the 2010 general election which increased the number of seats in the county from eleven to twelve.

It replaced the southern part of the former Teignbridge seat, including the town of Newton Abbot itself, as well as Dawlish and Teignmouth. Nominally the 2010 results was a gain of the seat (LD-Conservative) on a swing of 5.8%.   Teignbridge's other successor saw a very similar 6% swing with a much larger margin for the same winning party in Central Devon in the 2010 election.

Boundaries
The constituency is in the district of Teignbridge and has the following electoral wards: Ambrook, Bishopsteignton, Bradley, Buckland and Milber, Bushell, College, Dawlish Central and North East, Dawlish South West, Ipplepen, Kenton with Starcross, Kerswell-with-Combe, Kingsteignton East, Kingsteignton West, Shaldon and Stokeinteignhead, Teignmouth Central, Teignmouth East and Teignmouth West.

Members of Parliament

Elections

Elections in the 2010s

Additionally Richard Manley stood as PPC for the Renew Party, standing down in favour of Martin Wrigley as part of the Unite to Remain pact.

* Served as an MP in the 2005–2010 Parliament

See also
List of parliamentary constituencies in Devon

Notes

References

Parliamentary constituencies in Devon
Constituencies of the Parliament of the United Kingdom established in 2010
Teignbridge
Newton Abbot